Boccia at the 2004 Summer Paralympics took place in the Ano Liossia Olympic Hall in Athens. Contestants were categorised as follows:
BC1: players with cerebral palsy, competing with the help of an aide, who can only adjust the playing chair and give a ball to the player.
BC2: players with cerebral palsy not requiring an aide.
BC3: players with a very severe locomotor dysfunction, using an assistive device and assisted by an aide, who will remain in the player's box but who must keep his/her back to the court and eyes averted from play.
BC4: players with other locomotor disabilities, without an aide.

Participating countries

Medal table

Medal summary

References

 
2004 Summer Paralympics events
2004
2004 in bowls